Melinda Czink (born 22 October 1982) is a former professional tennis player from Hungary. On 21 September 2009, she reached her career-high singles ranking of world No. 37.

Czink reached two WTA Tour singles finals. In 2005, she lost to Ana Ivanovic in Canberra. In 2009, she defeated Lucie Šafářová in Quebec City for her first and only WTA Tour title. On the ITF Circuit, she won 20 singles and nine doubles titles.

Tennis career

2000–2008
She played her first tournament at Budapest as a wildcard in 2000, and first entered the top 100 in 2003. Czink won several singles and doubles titles on the ITF Circuit.

2009
She reached the top 50 and won her first title at Quebec City; as the fifth seed, she defeated Aleksandra Wozniak in the semifinal, and Lucie Šafářová in the final. She also reached one semifinal and four quarterfinals during the season. At the end of the year, she played at the Tournament of Champions in Bali where she lost to Aravane Rezaï and to Sabine Lisicki in the round-robin stage.

2010
Czink started the year at the Brisbane International in Australia as seventh seed. She defeated Lucie Hradecká in the first round, and Barbora Záhlavová-Strýcová in the second, both in three sets; in the quarterfinals, she lost to Justine Henin. She reached the doubles final with Arantxa Parra Santonja; they lost to Andrea Hlaváčková and Lucie Hradecká. Next, she played the Hobart International, where she lost to Gisela Dulko in the first round, in straight sets. In the Australian Open, she lost in the first round to Stefanie Vögele.

2011
Czink missed the Australian Open. She won two ITF events in Dothan, Alabama, and Indian Harbour Beach before returning to Grand Slam play with a protected rank at Wimbledon. As the lowest-ranked player in the tournament at world No. 262, she drew tenth-seed Samantha Stosur in the first round. She recorded the biggest win of her career by upsetting the Australian, 6–3, 6–4. She then beat Anastasiya Yakimova of Belarus in two sets. In the third round, Czink lost for the first time to the 20th-seed Peng Shuai.

2012
Czink began the season at the Brisbane International, but lost in the first round to qualifier Vania King, in straight sets. Following this, she continued her hardcourt season at the Sydney International. In the first round of the main draw, she was defeated by Chanelle Scheepers. At the Australian Open, Czink lost in her second qualifying match.

Her next tournament was the Mexican Open. In the first round, she defeated Canadian Stéphanie Dubois in straight sets, before falling to Estrella Cabeza Candela. She then qualified for the Miami Open. In the first round, she crushed Alberta Brianti, but her run was cut short by 2011 French Open champion Li Na. She continued her U.S. season by qualifying for the Family Circle Cup in Charleston, South Carolina.

Czink's next tournament was the Morocco Open. She qualified without dropping a set, but was ousted by third seed Petra Cetkovská in the first round of the main draw.

Czink then headed to her home tournament at the Budapest Grand Prix. In the main draw, she defeated fellow qualifier Mervana Jugić-Salkić but fell in the second round to top seed Sara Errani, in three sets.

At the French Open, she crushed Anne Keothavong, 6–1, 6–2, in the first round, but was defeated by 22nd seed Anastasia Pavlyuchenkova in the following round.

Performance timelines

Singles

Doubles

WTA career finals

Singles: 2 (1 title, 1 runner-up)

Doubles: 1 (1 runner-up)

ITF Circuit finals

Singles: 28 (20–8)

Doubles: 16 (10–6)

References

External links

 
 
 

1982 births
Living people
Hungarian female tennis players
Olympic tennis players of Hungary
Tennis players at the 2004 Summer Olympics
Tennis players from Budapest
21st-century Hungarian women